The Swedish Ski Association is a sports governing body for skiing in Sweden. It was established in Sundsvall on 11 December 1908 as the Swedish Cross-Country Skiing Association before changing name in 1911. The headquarters were originally located in Stockholm before relocating to Falun on 3 May 2001.

Their objective is to get as many people as possible to discover the joy and benefits of being active in the snow. Covering and arranging national and major international championships, youth activities, encouraging exercise, improving public health and through this making social impact.

Chairmen
1908-1910 - Fritz af Sandeberg
1910-1915 - C G A Lindencrona
1915-1922 - Sven Hermelin
1922-1948 - Sixtus Janson
1948-1952 - Björn Kjellström
1952-1961 - Sigge Bergman
1961-1965 - Karl Arne Wegerfelt
1965-1974 - Nils Stenberg
1974-1977 - Stig Synnergren
1977-1982 - Arne Jägmo
1982-1996 - Sven Larsson
1996-2008 - Carl Eric Stålberg
2008-2018 - Mats Årjes
2018- Karin Mattsson Weijber

References

External links
 Official website 

National members of the International Ski Federation
1908 establishments in Sweden
Sports organizations established in 1908
Skiing in Sweden
Skiing organizations
Ski